Patrick Gerald Willdigg (born 5 June 1932) was an English footballer who was signed to Port Vale from 1950 to 1956. He later played for Northwich Victoria.

Career
Willdigg was signed to Stoke City, before crossing the Potteries divide to join Port Vale in May 1950. He made his Second Division debut at Vale Park in a 1–1 draw with Liverpool on 3 December 1955, and also played in the 2–0 defeat at Doncaster Rovers seven days later. He never played another game for the "Valiants" though, and was instead transferred to Northwich Victoria by manager Freddie Steele in the summer of 1956.

Career statistics
Source:

References

1932 births
Living people
Footballers from Stoke-on-Trent
English footballers
Association football inside forwards
Stoke City F.C. players
Port Vale F.C. players
Northwich Victoria F.C. players
English Football League players